Nemesio Nemesyevich Pozuelo (born   July 7, 1940, Kharkov, Ukrainian SSR, USSR) is a Soviet football player, forward. Master of Sports of the USSR (1963).

Biography 
Son of Spanish refugees. His father was a member of the Central Committee of the Communist Party of Spain, his mother died of cancer when Pozuelo was 7 years old.

He has been identified in an orphanage in Ivanovo, where he started playing football.

Since 1960 - the main player FC Torpedo Moscow (whose pupil school football is). In the second half of the season 1964 moved to the  Spartak, started in 1965,  Zenit, but was disqualified for life as a frequent violator of the sport mode.

In 1996, he returned to Spain, to the city of Velilla de San Antonio. He worked as a coach of children's school.

References

External links
 НЕМЕСИО ПОСУЭЛО — РАНО УГАСШАЯ «ЗВЕЗДА»

1940 births
Footballers from Kharkiv
Living people
Soviet footballers
Soviet Top League players
FC Torpedo Moscow players
FC Spartak Moscow players
FC Zenit Saint Petersburg players
Russian people of Spanish descent
Association football forwards